Whakarewarewa (reduced version of Te Whakarewarewatanga O Te Ope Taua A Wahiao, meaning The gathering place for the war parties of Wahiao, often abbreviated to Whaka by locals) is a Rotorua semi-rural geothermal area in the Taupo Volcanic Zone of New Zealand. This was the site of the Māori fortress of Te Puia, first occupied around 1325, and known as an impenetrable stronghold never taken in battle. Māori have lived here ever since, taking full advantage of the geothermal activity in the valley for heating and cooking.

Whakarewarewa has some 500 pools, most of which are alkaline chloride hot springs, and at least 65 geyser vents, each with their own name. Seven geysers are currently active.

Many of the thermal features at Whakarewarewa have been adversely affected by Rotorua residents taking advantage of the underlying geothermal fluids of the city by drawing shallow wells ( deep) to extract hot water for both domestic and commercial heating. A bore closure programme in 1987–1988 resulted in 106 wells within  of Pohutu Geyser being cemented shut, with another 120 wells outside the radius being shut due to a punitive royalty charging regime. There has subsequently been a pronounced recovery in the geysers and hot springs at Whakarewarewa.

The area features Te Pākira Marae and Wahiao meeting house, a meeting place of the Tūhourangi hapū of Ngāti Puta, Ngāti Uruhina, Ngāti Wāhiao, Tūhourangi and Ngāti Taoi.

Geysers

Most of the currently active geysers at Whakarewarewa are located on Geyser Flat and aligned on a common fissure. This is a highly complex system, with the activity of one geyser affecting another.

No large eruptions occurred between 1972–1988, and it seems its recovery was directly linked to the sudden reduction of well drawoff in 1987. Kereru Geyser is probably independent of other springs on the fissure.

Prince of Wales Feathers Geyser, Pohutu Geyser's closest neighbour, always precedes Pohutu, a feeble jet at first but gradually increasing in power until a continuous  column is ejected at an angle, when Pohutu usually erupts also. Sometimes Waikorohihi Geyser erupts a discontinuous  jet, then Prince of Wales Feathers will commence, later followed by Pohutu.

The water in Te Horu's vent began to overflow again in 1998. A very direct connection exists between Te Horu and Pohutu, with air-cooled water erupted from Pohutu largely falling in Te Horu's vent. This may explain the popular belief that Pohutu is more active when there is a south wind, because most erupted water is then blown away to the north, whereas with a north wind much is returned to cool the system and delay the next eruption.

Mahanga Geyser, also called the Boxing Glove, is an old geyser not known to erupt until 1961. Its  eruptions occur quite independently of its near neighbour Waikorohihi.

Beyond Geyser Flat is Waikite Geyser, which forms the apex of a prominent sinter mound 260 m south of Pohutu. This last erupted in March 1967, and since then the vent has remained dry and weakly steaming. In the past Waikite tended to erupt after prolonged periods of excessive rain, suggesting that the level of water in its vent is dependent on rainfall. It is hoped that Waikite may one day erupt again. Meanwhile, Pareia Geyser, just beyond Waikite, has recently reactivated.

Papakura Geyser is the other notable dormant geyser at Whakarewarewa,  The cessation of eruptions from Papakura was directly responsible for initiating the Rotorua Monitoring Programme in 1981.

Demographics

Tihiotonga-Whakarewarewa had a population of 771 at the 2018 New Zealand census, an increase of 96 people (14.2%) since the 2013 census, and a decrease of 42 people (−5.2%) since the 2006 census. There were 288 households, comprising 390 males and 381 females, giving a sex ratio of 1.02 males per female. The median age was 43.2 years (compared with 37.4 years nationally), with 117 people (15.2%) aged under 15 years, 144 (18.7%) aged 15 to 29, 378 (49.0%) aged 30 to 64, and 135 (17.5%) aged 65 or older.

Ethnicities were 59.1% European/Pākehā, 37.4% Māori, 1.9% Pacific peoples, 13.2% Asian, and 3.1% other ethnicities. People may identify with more than one ethnicity.

The percentage of people born overseas was 24.1, compared with 27.1% nationally.

Although some people chose not to answer the census's question about religious affiliation, 44.4% had no religion, 37.7% were Christian, 2.7% had Māori religious beliefs, 2.7% were Hindu, 0.8% were Muslim, 0.8% were Buddhist and 4.7% had other religions.

Of those at least 15 years old, 156 (23.9%) people had a bachelor's or higher degree, and 96 (14.7%) people had no formal qualifications. The median income was $33,800, compared with $31,800 nationally. 126 people (19.3%) earned over $70,000 compared to 17.2% nationally. The employment status of those at least 15 was that 336 (51.4%) people were employed full-time, 93 (14.2%) were part-time, and 36 (5.5%) were unemployed.

Education

Gallery

References

External links

Website of Whakarewarewa and the NZ Maori Arts & Crafts Institute
Website of Whakarewarewa Thermal Village Tours

Taupō Volcanic Zone
Geysers of New Zealand
Geothermal areas in New Zealand
Tourist attractions in Rotorua
Landforms of the Bay of Plenty Region
Hot springs of New Zealand
Suburbs of Rotorua
Rotorua Volcanic Centre